The Marshal's Daughter is a 1953 American action film directed by William Berke and written by Bob Duncan. The film stars Laurie Anders, Hoot Gibson, Ken Murray, Preston Foster and Johnny Mack Brown. The film was released on June 26, 1953, by United Artists.

Plot
After his wife's death, Ben Dawson retires and forms a traveling medicine show. His infant daughter Laurie grows up to be a sharpshooter and performer in the show.

A banker named Anderson is behind a criminal scheme cheating ranchers out of their money. He hires notorious gunslinger Trigger Gans for protection. Ben realizes that Gans was the one who killed his wife.

Laurie is glad that rancher Russ Mason is in love with her but, knowing something must be done about the unlawful deeds going on, disguises herself as "El Coyote" and conducts a form of vigilante justice. She ultimately fights Anderson one-on-one in a canyon. Victorious, she sheds her costume upon returning, but Russ spots it and realizes her secret identity, but her father does not.

Cast
Laurie Anders as Laurie Dawson
Hoot Gibson as Marshal Ben Dawson
Ken Murray as 'Smiling Billy' Murray
Preston Foster as Preston Foster
Johnny Mack Brown as Johnny Mack Brown
Jimmy Wakely as Jimmy Wakely
Buddy Baer as Buddy Baer
Harry Lauter as Russ Mason
Robert Bray as Anderson 
Bob Duncan as Trigger Gans
Pamela Ann Murray as Baby Laurie Dawson
Tex Ritter as Background Singer

References

External links
 

1953 films
American black-and-white films
United Artists films
1950s action films
American action films
Films directed by William A. Berke
1950s English-language films
1950s American films